Moustafa Tajiki (6 April 1932 – 15 June 2010) was an Iranian wrestler. He competed in the men's freestyle lightweight at the 1960 Summer Olympics, finishing in fourth place.

References

External links
 

1932 births
2010 deaths
Iranian male sport wrestlers
Olympic wrestlers of Iran
Wrestlers at the 1960 Summer Olympics
Sportspeople from Tehran